Al-Imra International University - AIU is a Somali private university located in Mogadishu.

AIU was set up on 31 July 2014. A special event marking the opening was held in Mogadishu. AIU is registered in the Ministry of Culture and Higher Education.  AIU held its first convocation ceremony on October 17, 2018.

References

Universities and colleges in Somalia
Universities in Somalia
2014 establishments in Somalia
Educational institutions established in 2014
Universities in Mogadishu